Guam competed at the 2019 World Aquatics Championships in Gwangju, South Korea from 12 to 28 July.

Swimming

Guam entered three swimmers.

Men

Women

References

Nations at the 2019 World Aquatics Championships
Guam at the World Aquatics Championships
2019 in Guamanian sports